The culture of Brisbane derives from mainstream Australian culture and incorporates a strong history in the performing arts, music and sport.

Queensland Cultural Centre
The Queensland Cultural Centre, located at South Bank, within the suburb of South Brisbane, is the cultural hub of Brisbane.  The Queensland Cultural Centre contains the Queensland Museum, the Queensland Art Gallery, the Queensland Gallery of Modern Art, the State Library of Queensland, Queensland Writers Centre, and the Queensland Performing Arts Centre.

Visual arts
In addition to the Queensland Gallery of Modern Art and Queensland Art Gallery, the universities based in Brisbane also contain art galleries.  The University of Queensland has a purpose built gallery on its St. Lucia campus. The Queensland College of Art (a part of Griffith University), is based on the former World Expo 88 site at South Bank, and the QUT Art Museum (a part of the Queensland University of Technology) is based at the QUT Gardens Point campus. Every year the Rotary Clubs of Stones Corner, Hamilton and Brisbane High-Rise host the Rotary Art Spectacular, one of Queensland’s most prestigious art exhibition. Recently, artist residency spaces House Conspiracy and Outer Space opened in West End.

Public art

Brisbane has a range of public sculptures ranging from the large impressive statue of Queen Victoria in front of the Old Executive building to a number of others. King George Square in front of the Brisbane City Hall features an impressive statue of King George V and also the Petrie Tableau. There other examples of sculpture featured in Anzac Square.

City Roos sculptures made by sculptor Christopher Trotter during 1999 from scrapmetal from a broad cross-section of industries are not far from the former Law Courts Complex in George Street.

The Brisbane City council has an online database of public artworks which can be searched for locations, artists and information about individual artworks. The database covers the whole Brisbane Council area.

Performing arts

Performing Arts Education
Queensland University of Technology and the University of Southern Queensland (based in Toowoomba) offer professional acting courses.  Some notable professionals who have taught performing arts in Brisbane include Rhoda Felgate, Babette Stephens, Jean Trundell, Joan Whalley, Alan Edwards, Ian Thomson and Harold Collins.

Venues

The Queensland Performing Arts Centre is also located at South Bank. It is also  part of the Queensland Cultural Centre and contains Brisbane’s main theatres (Lyric Theatre, Concert Hall, Cremorne Theatre, and the Playhouse). The Australian Ballet visits Brisbane every second year and other touring companies also visit Brisbane each year. Large scale visiting musicals make up the majority of offerings at the Lyric Theatre.

The Queensland Conservatorium and Queensland College of Art (both of which are part of Griffith University) were subsequently built within the South Bank Parklands, along with many other buildings, including the Suncorp Piazza.

Other theatres located in Brisbane include the Tribal Theatre, Brisbane Arts Theatre, Twelfth Night Theatre, Roundhouse Theatre, Metro Arts Theatre, Judith Wright Arts Centre and the Brisbane Powerhouse. There are also several theatres located at the universities, including the QUT Gardens Theatre & the QUT Creative Industries Precinct (both of which are at the Queensland University of Technology), and Geoffrey Rush Drama Studio & Schonell Theatre (both of which are at the University of Queensland). Newly constructed in an old community building in Spring Hill is the Centre Stage Theatre.

Outdoor venues include the Roma Street Parkland Amphitheatre and Riverstage in the City Botanic Gardens.

One of the largest new entertainment precincts, Northshore Brisbane, which hosts Brisbane's largest and most immersive events and activations. With hundreds of square metres of handstand, riverfront event space, Northshore is transforming into one of Brisbane's key entertainment and event precincts.

Historical venues
Brisbane has a long history of demolishing performing arts venues and theatres. Festival Hall, a music and entertainment venue was demolished in 2003. Before the Queensland Performing Arts Centre was built, major performing arts theatres included the 2,000 seat Her Majesty's Theatre in Queen Street, which was designed in 1885 by Andreas Stombuco and opened in 1888, was demolished in 1986. It was replaced by the Hilton Hotel without a theatre. Artists such as Laurence Olivier, Vivien Leigh, Robert Helpmann and Dame Nellie Melba performed there. The Suncorp Theatre (originally called the SGIO Theatre), a purpose built drama theatre for the Queensland Theatre Company, was also demolished in 2007.  The interior of the 2,000 seat Regent Theatre in Queen Street was demolished and replaced by four multiplex cinemas. After campaigning, led by Veronica Kelly from the University of Queensland English Department (UQ was a major stakeholder as the medical school inherited shares in the building as part of the Mayne estate), the original foyer was retained and remnants from the original 1929 auditorium were used in one of the downstairs multiplex cinemas renamed the "Regent Showcase" cinema. These cinemas have since been demolished in 2012 for a 40 floor high rise office block development. Small, multi purpose conference spaces were proposed for weekend only use as cinemas, however the office tower development has failed and as of 2014, the land still remains vacant.

Performing arts groups
Brisbane has a small number of professional performing arts companies. These include: Queensland Theatre Company, The Queensland Orchestra, Grin and Tonic Theatre Company, Operatif!, LaBoite Theatre Company, Opera Queensland, Queensland Ballet and Australasian Dance Collective. The Queensland Pops Orchestra make a positive contribution.

Most cultural organisations in Brisbane run on an amateur or university basis. There are also many community choirs theatres and bands including the Sandgate Theatre Inc, King Street Players, Mousetrap Theatre, Imogen Children's Chorale, Queensland Philharmonic Chorale, the Brisbane Chorale, the Queensland Festival Chorus, Exaudi Australis, the Queensland University Musical Society (QUMS), the Queensland Choir.Queensland Conservatorium Griffith University, Queensland University Musical Society (QUMS), CIP, Queensland Musical Society, Brisbane Philharmonic Orchestra, Queensland Wind and Brass, St Lucia Orchestra, Brisbane Symphonic Band, South East Queensland Symphonic Winds, Brisbane Municipal Concert Band, Brisbane Arts Theatre, Brisbane Apollo Choir, Brisbane Excelsior Brass Band, Queensland Youth Orchestras, Brisbane Regional Youth Orchestra, Queensland Wind Orchestra, Centenary Theatre Group, Villanova Players, Ignatians Musical Society, Queensland Musical Theatre, Savoyards Musical Comedy Society and Springboard Theatre Company.  The Brisbane Musical Theatre Competition, which was founded in 1997, showcases and promotes local talent.

Media
Brisbane has several local arts news and review organisations. Some of the major platforms include Theatre Haus, Bravo Brisbane, Absolute Theatre and Blue Curtains.

Legacy of World Expo '88
Brisbane also held World Expo 88 at South Bank, from April to October 1988, on land adjacent to the Queensland Performing Arts Centre.  The Expo site was converted into the South Bank Parklands following World Expo 88.

Annual events

The Royal Queensland Exhibition (known locally as the Ekka), an agricultural exhibition held each August at the Brisbane Showgrounds in Bowen Hills is the longest-running major annual event held in Brisbane, during which there is a public holiday for each local government area across Brisbane so as to enable widespread public attendance.

The Brisbane Festival, which includes one of the nation's largest annual fireworks displays called 'Riverfire', and which is held each September at South Bank Parklands, the CBD and surrounding areas is the second of Brisbane's major annual events, with the 'Riverfire' fireworks displays attended by hundreds of thousands of residents annually.

The Brisbane International Film Festival (BIFF) is held in July/August each year in a variety of venues around Brisbane. BIFF features new films and retrospectives by domestic and international filmmakers along with seminars and awards.

The Buddha Birth Day festival at South Bank parklands attracts over 200,000 visitors each year, and is the largest event of its type in Australia.

There also many smaller community events such as the Paniyiri festival (a Greek cultural festival held over two days in May), the Brisbane Medieval Fayre and Tournament (held each June), the Bridge to Brisbane charity fun run the Caxton Street Seafood and Wine Festival.

Major events are often held at the 171,000 square metre Brisbane Convention & Exhibition Centre in South Brisbane.

Cuisine
Brisbane is home to over 6,000 restaurants and dining establishments, with outdoor dining featuring prominently. The most popular cuisines by number of dining establishments are Japanese, Chinese, Modern Australian, Italian, American, Indian, and Vietnamese. Moreton Bay bugs, less commonly known as flathead lobsters, are an ingredient named for the Brisbane region and which feature commonly in the city's cuisine, along with macadamia nuts, also native to the region.

Notable Brisbane people
 
 List of Brisbane people

See also

List of festivals in Brisbane
List of public art in Brisbane
List of museums in Brisbane

References

 
Brisbane
Tourist attractions in Brisbane